The 2017 Can-Am 500 was a Monster Energy NASCAR Cup Series race held on November 12, 2017, at Phoenix International Raceway in Avondale, Arizona. Contested over 312 laps on the one mile (1.6 km) oval, it was the 35th race of the 2017 Monster Energy NASCAR Cup Series season, ninth race of the Playoffs, and final race of the Round of 8. Matt Kenseth recorded his 39th Series and final win in his Circle K Toyota Camry.

Report

Background

Phoenix International Raceway – also known as PIR – is a one-mile, low-banked tri-oval race track located in Avondale, Arizona. It is named after the nearby metropolitan area of Phoenix. The motorsport track opened in 1964 and currently hosts two NASCAR race weekends annually. PIR has also hosted the IndyCar Series, CART, USAC and the Rolex Sports Car Series. The raceway is currently owned and operated by International Speedway Corporation.

The raceway was originally constructed with a  road course that ran both inside and outside of the main tri-oval. In 1991 the track was reconfigured with the current  interior layout. PIR has an estimated grandstand seating capacity of around 67,000. Lights were installed around the track in 2004 following the addition of a second annual NASCAR race weekend.

Phoenix International Raceway is home to two annual NASCAR race weekends, one of 13 facilities on the NASCAR schedule to host more than one race weekend a year. The track is both the first and last stop in the western United States, as well as the fourth and penultimate track on the schedule.

Entry list

First practice

Qualifying

Qualifying results

Practice (post-qualifying)

Second practice

Final practice

Race

Stage 1

Start 
Ryan Blaney led the field to the green flag at 2:37 p.m., He led a total of 11 laps, Chase Elliott took the lead on lap 11 and led 14 laps, Denny Hamlin took the lead on lap 26 and led only one lap, Chase Elliott regained the lead on lap 27 and led only one lap, Hamlin regained the lead on lap 28 and led 40 laps. The first caution of the race flew on lap 77 for the conclusion of the first stage.

Stage 2 
The race restarted on lap 84 and it remained green for 67 laps.

Final stage 

The race restarted on lap 159 and it remained green for 71 laps. Denny Hamlin led on lap 228, with Matt Kenseth 2.5 seconds behind.

The race restarted on lap 236 and the fourth caution of the race flew on lap 239 for debris in turn 2, Dale Earnhardt Jr. won the free pass under caution.

The race restarted on lap 244 and it remained green for 9 laps.

The race restarted on lap 259 and the sixth caution of the race flew three laps later for a single-car wreck in turn 3 by Cole Whitt, Kasey Kahne won the free pass under caution.

The race restarted on lap 266 and it remained green for 10 laps, The seventh caution of the race flew on lap 276 for Hamlin cutting a tire down after a few laps earlier he and Elliott slammed into the wall.

The race restarted on lap 282, Elliott was aggressive to get the lead from Kenseth with 29 to go but Kenseth fought back and took the lead with 10 laps to go and drove on to score his first victory in 52 races since 2016 in New Hampshire.  With Kenseth's win Brad Keselowski was the final driver to advance to the Championship Four.

Post race 
"I don't know what to say except thank the Lord," an emotional Kenseth said after climbing out of his car. "It's been an amazing journey. Just got one race left and everybody dreams of going out a winner. We won today. Nobody can take that away from us."

Race results

Stage results

Stage 1
Laps: 75

Stage 2
Laps: 75

Final stage results

Stage 3
Laps: 162

Race statistics
 Lead changes: 5 among different drivers
 Cautions/Laps: 7 for 41
 Red flags: 1 for 5 minutes and 3 seconds
 Time of race: 2 hours, 57 minutes, 23 seconds
 Average speed:

Media

Television
NBC covered the race on the television side. Rick Allen, two–time Phoenix winner Jeff Burton and Steve Letarte had the call in the booth for the race. Dave Burns, Parker Kligerman, Marty Snider and Kelli Stavast reported from pit lane during the race.

Radio
MRN had the radio call for the race, which was simulcast on Sirius XM NASCAR Radio.

Standings after the race

Drivers' Championship standings

Manufacturers' Championship standings

Note: Only the first 16 positions are included for the driver standings.

References

2017 in sports in Arizona
Can-Am 500
NASCAR races at Phoenix Raceway
Can-Am 500